KGBX-FM (105.9 MHz) is a radio station broadcasting an adult contemporary format. Licensed to Nixa, Missouri, United States, the station serves the Springfield, Missouri, market.  The station is owned by iHeartMedia, Inc. and licensed as iHM Licenses, LLC.

History
The station went on the air as KBLR-FM on April 23, 1979.  On July 18, 1979, the station changed its call letters to KYOO-FM. This station served the Bolivar, Missouri, area but could be heard in Springfield.

On October 10, 1989, KYOO-FM 106.3 was sold. The station was moved to 105.9 and became the current KGBX-FM primarily serving Springfield.

The city of license was eventually moved from Bolivar to Nixa.

References

External links

GBX-FM
Radio stations established in 1979
Mainstream adult contemporary radio stations in the United States
1979 establishments in Missouri
IHeartMedia radio stations